Cosmin Marius Contra (born 15 December 1975) is a Romanian football manager and former player. He is the current manager of Saudi Arabian club Damac.

Primarily an attacking-minded right-back, he was also deployed as a midfielder. He played professionally in three countries his own notwithstanding, mainly Spain where he appeared for Alavés, Atlético Madrid and Getafe, amassing La Liga totals of 188 games and eight goals. A Romania international for nearly 15 years, he represented the nation in two European Championships.

As a coach, Contra won the Cupa României with Petrolul Ploiești in 2013 and the Cupa Ligii with Dinamo București four years later. In September 2017, he was appointed at the helm of the Romania national team.

Playing career

Club

Politehnica and Dinamo
Born in Timișoara, Cosmin Contra started his professional career at local club Politehnica Timișoara, making his Divizia A debut under coach Costică Ștefănescu on 27 February 1994 at age 18 in a 1–0 victory in the West derby against UTA Arad. At the end of his first season they were relegated to Divizia B, but he stayed with the side, promoting back after one year. Midway through 1995–96, he signed for Dinamo București at the request of coach Cornel Dinu. During his period with the Red Dogs he failed to win any trophy, the team's best performance during his stay being a runner-up finish in 1998–99; he also made his debut in European competitions, appearing in four matches in the 1996 UEFA Intertoto Cup and two in the 1997–98 UEFA Cup.

Alavés
After three and a half campaigns with Dinamo, Contra was transferred for $800,000 to Deportivo Alavés in the Spanish La Liga. He was an important part in the Basques' runner-up run in the UEFA Cup, his performances earning him in a place in the UEFA Team of the Year. 

Contra scored eight goals in all competitions during his spell at the Mendizorrotza Stadium. In December 2021, as the club celebrated its 100th birthday, he was voted its best-ever right-back by newspaper Noticias de Álava.

Milan and Atlético
In the summer of 2001, Contra moved to Italian club A.C. Milan, but his spell there lasted only one season. In September 2002 he returned to Spain and joined Atlético Madrid, appearing very rarely in the 2003–04 campaign due to a serious ankle condition; while still with Milan, he was suspended after a scuffle with Juventus's Edgar Davids.

Contra signed for West Bromwich Albion on loan in August 2004, making his debut in a 2–1 defeat at Colchester United in the second round of the Football League Cup on 21 September. His maiden Premier League appearance occurred almost two months later, when they lost 2–1 at home against Middlesbrough.

Overall, the loan was not particularly successful, with Contra playing just six games and receiving a red card in his last match, a 0–5 home loss to Liverpool. He then returned to his country and Liga I, at the club which brought him up as a player, Politehnica Timișoara, where he managed to be recalled to the national side due to his good performances.

Getafe

Contra returned to Spain in August 2005, agreeing to a season-long loan with Getafe which was subsequently made permanent (he was supposed to have arrived at the Coliseum Alfonso Pérez before, but the move was blocked because the squad had too many non-EU players, and his compatriot Gheorghe Craioveanu only ceased to be considered a foreigner the same year). He was used regularly by the Madrid outskirts side, battling for a first-team slot with David Cortés.

In the 2007–08 UEFA Cup, Contra netted in both legs of the quarter-final tie against Bayern Munich, which ended in a 4–4 aggregate elimination after extra time. Earlier in the competition, he scored a penalty kick against AEK Athens, appearing in that match even though his father had died just hours before.

Later career
In late January 2010, after being ousted from the starting XI by manager Míchel, Contra left Getafe and returned to his country, rejoining hometown's Politehnica Timișoara initially until June. On 26 February he made his debut in his second spell for the club, scoring from a 30-yard free kick in the last minute of the 2–1 victory over Politehnica Iași. Two months later, at Steaua București, he again found the net from two set pieces, one from a penalty (3–3 draw); during his second stint, he played mainly as a central midfielder.

On 29 August 2010, Contra scored again from a free kick and again against Steaua, in a late 1–1 equaliser. His contract expired the following day, and on 9 September he agreed to a new deal, being announced as new player-coach six days later. His last game as a player took place on 13 November 2010, in a 1–1 home draw with Unirea Urziceni.

International
Contra earned 73 caps for Romania and scored seven goals, making his debut on 24 April 1996 at the age of 20 when coach Anghel Iordănescu sent him on the field in the 65th minute in order to replace captain Gheorghe Hagi in a friendly against Georgia which ended with a 5–0 victory. He played three games in the Euro 2000 qualifiers, being selected by Emerich Jenei to be part of the final tournament squad, where he was used as a starter the first three matches, helping the team pass the group stage, but did not play in the 2–0 loss to Italy in the quarter-finals, being suspended after receiving two yellow cards in the previous fixtures. He made nine appearances and netted twice in the 2002 FIFA World Cup qualifying phase, one in a 2–0 away victory over Georgia and one in the second leg of the play-off against Slovenia which was lost 3–2 on aggregate.

Contra made six appearances in the Euro 2004 qualifiers, scoring a hat-trick in the 7–0 away rout of Luxembourg, playing six times in the 2006 FIFA World Cup qualifying campaign. He contributed six matches and two goals, one in a 3–0 victory against Luxembourg and one in the 2–0 defeat of Slovenia in qualification for Euro 2008, being used in the final tournament by manager Victor Pițurcă in all the minutes as his side failed to progress from their group. 

Contra played four games in the 2010 World Cup qualifiers and, on 1 April 2009, after a match with Austria, he announced his retirement from international football; however, on 30 August 2010, the 34-year-old was recalled by manager Răzvan Lucescu for the Euro 2012 qualifiers, making his last appearance in a 1–1 against Albania.

Coaching career

Early career
Contra made his Timișoara debut as a manager in September 2010, with a win against Sportul Studențesc București. Even though the team never lost a game under his guidance, he was sacked after 11 matches – six wins, five draws – because of a conflict with the club's owner.

Contra returned to Spain in July 2012, being appointed at Segunda División B side Fuenlabrada. He started the campaign well and, after ten rounds, the team found themselves in a play-off position; however, after an offer from FC Petrolul Ploiești in his homeland arrived, he asked to be released from his contract.

Petrolul
Contra took over at Petrolul in October 2012, replacing Mircea Rednic. In his first season he reached the final of the Romanian Cup, defeating CFR Cluj 1–0; additionally, the club finished third in the domestic league, thus securing qualification to the Europa League after an 18-year-absence.

Petrolul managed to knock out Víkingur Gøta in the Europa League second qualifying round and Vitesse Arnhem in the third, but were eliminated in the play-offs by Swansea City after being bested 5–1 in Wales and winning 2–1 at home.

Getafe
On 10 March 2014, Contra returned to Getafe and the Spanish top flight after four years, replacing Luis García who was fired after a long run of bad results which led the team to only a point above the relegation zone, and without a league win since November. His first match in charge came four days later, a 3–3 home draw against Granada. They finally won a game on the penultimate day of the month, emerging victorious at Valencia 3–1.

On 19 May 2014, Contra confirmed survival for the side after a 2–1 win away win over Rayo Vallecano.

Guangzhou R&F
On 18 December 2014, Contra was named as the new manager of Guangzhou R&F, replacing Sven-Göran Eriksson. He began working officially for the club on 4 January of the following year.

Alcorcón and Dinamo Bucharest
On 15 June 2016, Contra was appointed at Alcorcón. He was relieved of his duties on 12 October.

In February 2017, Contra became Dinamo Bucharest's new coach. He led the team to their first trophy in five years by winning the Cupa Ligii but, after advances from the Romanian Football Federation, he resigned from his post on 16 September.

Romania national team
On 17 September 2017, following Christoph Daum's dismissal, Contra was revealed as the new manager of Romania with the objective of qualifying for Euro 2020. His first game in charge was on 5 October, a 3–1 win in Ploiești against Kazakhstan in the 2018 FIFA World Cup qualifiers.

In November 2019, after the team could only finish in fourth place in the Euro 2020 qualifying phase behind Spain, Sweden and Norway, the Romanian Football Federation announced Contra would no longer continue on the bench.

Return to Dinamo
Contra returned to Dinamo Bucharest in August 2020, signing a two-year contract. He left on 3 December due to the club's financial problems.

Al-Ittihad
On 29 August 2021, Contra was appointed as manager of Al-Ittihad in the Saudi Professional League. His team led the league by 16 points over Al Hilal in February but ended the season two points behind that team, who he lost to twice.

Contra was dismissed by the Jeddah-based club in early July 2022, and replaced by Nuno Espírito Santo.

Damac
On 6 March 2023, Contra joined Damac of the same country and league.

Career statistics

International
Scores and results list Romania's goal tally first, score column indicates score after each Contra goal.

Managerial statistics

Honours

Player
Politehnica Timișoara
Divizia B: 1994–95

Alavés
UEFA Cup runner-up: 2000–01

Getafe
Copa del Rey runner-up: 2006–07, 2007–08

Individual
Romanian Footballer of the Year (Gazeta Sporturilor): 2001
UEFA Team of the Year: 2001

Manager
Petrolul Ploiești
Cupa României: 2012–13

Dinamo București
Cupa Ligii: 2016–17

Individual
Saudi Professional League Manager of the Month: February 2022

References

External links

1975 births
Living people
Romanian emigrants to Spain
Naturalised citizens of Spain
Sportspeople from Timișoara
Romanian footballers
Association football defenders
Association football midfielders
Liga I players
Liga II players
FC Dinamo București players
FC Politehnica Timișoara players
La Liga players
Deportivo Alavés players
Atlético Madrid footballers
Getafe CF footballers
Serie A players
A.C. Milan players
Premier League players
West Bromwich Albion F.C. players
Romania under-21 international footballers
Romania international footballers
UEFA Euro 2000 players
UEFA Euro 2008 players
Romanian expatriate footballers
Expatriate footballers in Spain
Expatriate footballers in Italy
Expatriate footballers in England
Romanian expatriate sportspeople in Spain
Romanian expatriate sportspeople in Italy
Romanian expatriate sportspeople in England
Romanian football managers
Liga I managers
FC Politehnica Timișoara managers
FC Petrolul Ploiești managers
FC Dinamo București managers
La Liga managers
Segunda División managers
Segunda División B managers
CF Fuenlabrada managers
Getafe CF managers
AD Alcorcón managers
Chinese Super League managers
Guangzhou City F.C. managers
Saudi Professional League managers
Ittihad FC managers
Damac FC managers
Romania national football team managers
Romanian expatriate football managers
Expatriate football managers in Spain
Expatriate football managers in China
Expatriate football managers in Saudi Arabia
Romanian expatriate sportspeople in China
Romanian expatriate sportspeople in Saudi Arabia